Alejandro César Donatti (born 24 October 1986) is an Argentine footballer who plays as a centre-back.

Career

Tigre 
Donatti played in 2012-13 season on loan for Tigre and was a member of the campaign in the 2012 Copa Sudamericana in which the club finished as runners-up.

Flamengo 
Donatti was signed by Flamengo on a three-year contract on 6 July 2016. On 31 July 2016 Donatti debuted for his new club replacing injured Juan on the 55th minute, Flamengo won Coritiba 2-0. His first match as a starter was on 24 August 2016 playing in the Copa Sudamericana match against Figueirense, Donatti didn't have a good match, including an error in one of the goals that Flamengo suffered, his team lost 4-2 in Estádio Orlando Scarpelli.

Club Tijuana 
On June 21, 2017 Club Tijuana signed Donatti from Flamengo for US$1,65m.

Career statistics 

(Correct )

Honours 
 Libertad de Sunchales
 Argentino B: 2007

 Boca Unidos
 Argentino B: 2009

 Flamengo
 Campeonato Carioca: 2017

References

External links 
 

Living people
1986 births
People from Rafaela
Argentine footballers
Argentine expatriate footballers
Argentine people of Italian descent
Association football defenders
Sportspeople from Santa Fe Province
9 de Julio de Rafaela players
San Lorenzo de Almagro footballers
Libertad de Sunchales footballers
Boca Unidos footballers
Rosario Central footballers
Club Atlético Tigre footballers
CR Flamengo footballers
Club Tijuana footballers
Racing Club de Avellaneda footballers
Argentine Primera División players
Primera Nacional players
Campeonato Brasileiro Série A players
Liga MX players
Argentine expatriate sportspeople in Brazil
Argentine expatriate sportspeople in Mexico
Expatriate footballers in Brazil
Expatriate footballers in Mexico